Kafr Qud (also spelled Kafr Qad) is a Palestinian village in the Jenin Governorate in the northern West Bank, located west of Jenin. According to the Palestinian Central Bureau of Statistics (PCBS) census, it had a population of 1,143 in 2007.

History
The village is situated on an ancient site, with cisterns cut out of rock, and old stones reused in housing. 

Pottery sherds from the Persian, Hellenistic, early and late Roman, Byzantine, early Muslim and Medieval eras have been found here.

Ottoman era
Kafr Qud, like the rest of Palestine, was incorporated into the Ottoman Empire in 1517, and in the census of 1596, the village appeared as "Kafr Qud" in the nahiya of Jabal Sami in the liwa of Nablus. It had a population of 19 households and 5 bachelors, all Muslim.  The villagers paid a fixed tax-tare of 33.3% on various agricultural products, including wheat, barley, summer crops, olive trees, goats and beehives, in addition to occasional revenues; a total of 2,567 akçe.

Edward Robinson identified Kafr Qud with "Caparcotia" when he passed by on June, 1838, part of the esh–Sha'rawiyeh esh–Shurkiyeh District.

On 14 June 1870 Victor Guérin noted that Kafr Qud was "hidden in the mountains with groves of olives and fig trees ... and very probably the place is Caparcotani of Ptolemy and the Peutinger map." He estimated the population to be 300. In 1882 the PEF's Survey of Western Palestine described Kafr Qud as a "good-sized village in a recess among the hills.”

British Mandate era
In the 1922 census of Palestine, conducted by the British Mandate authorities, Kufr Qud had a population of 161; 153 Muslims and 8 Christians, where the Christians were all Orthodox. This was almost unchanged in the 1931 census, when Kafr Qud had 41 occupied houses and a population of 162; 9 Christians and the rest Muslim.

In the 1945 statistics, the population was 250; 240 Muslims and 10 Christians, with 5463 dunams of land, according to an official land and population survey. 908 dunams were used for plantations and irrigable land, 2,170 dunams for cereals, while 14 dunams were built-up (urban) land.

Jordanian era
In the wake of the 1948 Arab–Israeli War, and after the 1949 Armistice Agreements, Kafr Qud  came under Jordanian rule. It was annexed by Jordan in 1950.

In 1961, the population was 362 persons.

Post-1967
Since the Six-Day War in 1967, Kafr Qud has been under Israeli occupation. The population Kafar Qud in the 1967 census conducted by Israel was 374, of whom 110 originated from the Israeli territory.

Geography
Kafr Qud is situated in the northern Sahl Arraba on narrow ravine below the Jabal Shibli mountain to the north. It has an average elevation of 330 meters above sea level. The Bir al-Balad (also known as "Bir Kafr Qud") spring inside the village serves as the closest source of water. It is located south of the road connecting al-Hashimiya with Jenin, and nearby localities include the former to the northwest, Kufeirit to the southwest, al-Manshiyya to the south and Burqin to the east.

The ancient site in the middle of Kafr Qud is small and surrounded by a gully near the Bir al-Balad spring. Most of the modern housing was built east of the site, although ancient building material is highly present in some walls. In 1979 the built-up area of the village amounted to roughly 15 dunams.

References

Bibliography

External links
Welcome To Kafr Qud
Survey of Western Palestine, Map 8:    IAA, Wikimedia commons 

Jenin Governorate
Villages in the West Bank
Municipalities of the State of Palestine